"Youngbloods" is a song recorded by Australian metalcore band the Amity Affliction in 2010. It was included as the title and fifth track on their second studio album. A music video was released in July 2011

Illy version

In 2013, "Youngbloods" was covered by Australian rapper Illy, featuring Ahren Stringer with additional lyrics added by Illy and Mark Landon. "Youngbloods" was released in September 2013 as the second single from Illy's fourth studio album, Cinematic. "Youngbloods" peaked at number 38 on the ARIA Charts.

"Youngbloods" was listed at 77 on the Triple J Hottest 100, 2013.

Charts

References

2013 singles
2010 songs
The Amity Affliction songs
Illy (rapper) songs
Songs written by M-Phazes